Federico Marcos del Rosario Errázuriz Zañartu (April 25, 1825 – July 20, 1877) was a Chilean political figure. He served as the president of Chile between 1871 and 1876.

Biography
He was born in Santiago in 1825, of Basque descent.
He studied law in the University of Chile.

He was made a deputy in parliament at an early age, and took some part in the parliamentary debates. In 1860 he was made chief of the province of Santiago, and introduced many reforms. In 1862, during Pérez's administration, he became secretary of justice and of public instruction; and in 1865, during the Chincha Islands War with Spain, he was secretary of war and the navy.

In 1871 Errázuriz became president of the republic of Chile, and introduced liberal reforms of great importance to the country, tending toward the secularization of public instruction and freedom of worship. He amended the constitution of 1833 by means of a law which was very much discussed in congress, abolished ecclesiastical privileges, and built several railways in the northern and southern parts of the country. He also organized several exhibitions of industry and art, the most important being the Exposición Universal of 1875, held in a magnificent palace built in the Quinta Normal de Agricultura expressly for that purpose. Errázuriz improved the navy by adding to it the two steel men-of-war “Cochrane” and “Blanco Encalada.” He also improved the condition of the army, and contributed greatly to the material progress and welfare of his country.

He died in Santiago soon after retiring from office.

Notes

References

External links

Genealogical chart of Errázuriz family 

1825 births
1877 deaths
F
People from Santiago
Chilean Ministers of Defense
Chilean people of Basque descent
Presidents of Chile
Liberal Party (Chile, 1849) politicians
Instituto Nacional General José Miguel Carrera alumni
Candidates for President of Chile